Enaliosuchus is a dubious genus of extinct marine crocodyliform within the family Metriorhynchidae that lived during the Valanginian stage of the Early Cretaceous. It is known from fossil remains found in France and Germany and it was first described in 1883,.  The name Enaliosuchus means "Marine crocodile", and is derived from the Greek Enalios- ("marine") and -suchos ("crocodile"). Two species are known: the type species E. macrospondylus, described in 1883, and the second species E. schroederi, described in 1936, which was likely the same animal as E. macrospondylus.

Description
Enaliosuchus was a carnivore that spent much, if not all, its life out at sea. No Enaliosuchus eggs or nest have been discovered, so little is known of the reptile's lifecycle, unlike other large marine reptiles of the Mesozoic, such as plesiosaurs or ichthyosaurs which are known to give birth to live young out at sea. Where Enaliosuchus mated, whether on land or at sea, is currently unknown.

Species 
The species within Enaliosuchus include :
 E. macrospondylus: type species from France and Germany of the Early Cretaceous (Valanginian).
 E. schroederi: from Germany of the Early Cretaceous Valanginian. (likely a junior synonym of E. macrospondylus ). 

Recent phylogenetic analysis supports the monophyly of Enaliosuchus. However, Enaliosuchus was later found to be a highly derived member of the genus Geosaurus or Cricosaurus, but Sachs et al. (2020) supports the theory that Enaliosuchus is a separate genus and Sachs et al. also found E. schroederi conspecific to E. macrospondylus.

References

Prehistoric pseudosuchian genera
Prehistoric marine crocodylomorphs
Early Cretaceous extinctions
Early Cretaceous crocodylomorphs of Europe
Fossil taxa described in 1883